Saidpur is an upazila of Nilphamari District in the Division of Rangpur, Bangladesh. Saidpur thana, later turned into an upazila, was established in 1915.

Geography
The upazila is bounded by Nilphamari Sadar and Kishoreganj upazilas on the north, Badarganj and Parbatipur upazilas on the south, Taraganj upazila on the east, Chirirbandar and Khansama upazilas on the west. Total area of Saidpur is 121.68 km2.

Demographics
As of the 2011 Bangladesh census, Saidpur has a population of 264461. Males constitute 52.19% of the population, and females 47.81%. This Upazila's eighteen up population is 98745. Saidpur has an average literacy rate of 54.6% (7+ years), and the national average of 48.4% literate.

Points of interest
 Saidpur Airport
 Syedpur Railway Workshop
 Chini Mosque (established 1863)
 Martuza Institute (established 1882)
 Al Jamiatul Islamia Darul-Ulam Madrasa (established 1945)

Administration
Saidpur Upazila is divided into 1 municipality (Saidpur Municipality) and six union parishads: Bangalipur, Botlagari, Kamarpukur, Kasirambelpukur, Khatamadhupur, and Saidpur Cantonment. The union parishads are subdivided into 42 mauzas and 39 villages.

Saidpur Municipality is subdivided into 15 wards and 43 mahallas.

See also
Upazilas of Bangladesh
Districts of Bangladesh
Divisions of Bangladesh

References

Upazilas of Nilphamari District